Lusia is a comune (municipality) in the Province of Rovigo in the Italian region Veneto, located about  southwest of Venice and about  northwest of Rovigo.

The municipality of Lusia contains the frazioni (subdivisions, mainly villages and hamlets) Alberone, Arzaron, Bornio, Ca'Morosini, Cavazzana, Ceresolo-Santa Lucia, Contra' Nova, Garzare, Giare, Marasso, Pioppello, and Saline.

Lusia borders the following municipalities: Barbona, Lendinara, Rovigo, Sant'Urbano, Villanova del Ghebbo.

Demographic evolution

References

Cities and towns in Veneto